Tonda may refer to:

People
 Tonda (name)

Places
 Tonda Station, Osaka Prefecture, Japan
 Tonda Wildlife Management Area, Papua New Guinea
 Tonda (parish), a civil parish in the municipality of Tondela, Portugal
 Tonda, a mountain of the Iberian System in Spain

Other uses
 Tonda (orangutan), a captive orangutan of the United States
 Tonda languages, a language group of New Guinea

See also

Tanda (disambiguation)
Tondo (disambiguation)
Tonka (disambiguation)
Tonna (disambiguation)